Lambda Sagittarii (Latinized from λ Sagittarii), formally named Kaus Borealis , is a star in the southern constellation of Sagittarius. The star marks the top of the Archer's bow.

Properties

With an apparent visual magnitude of +2.82, this is one of the brighter members of the constellation and, according to the Bortle Dark-Sky Scale, it is readily visible to the naked eye.

Being 2.1 degrees south of the ecliptic, Lambda Sgr is sometimes occulted by the Moon and, rarely, by a planet. The last planet to pass in front of it was Venus, on 19 November 1984. The previous occasion was 5 December 1865, when it was occulted by Mercury.

Kaus Borealis is a subgiant star with a stellar classification of K0 IV. It has a mass 2.6 times that of the Sun and a physical size of about 11.2 times the Sun's radius. This expanded outer envelope is radiating energy at an effective temperature of 4,770 K, causing it to glow with the cool orange hue of a K-type star.

Nomenclature

λ Sagittarii (Latinised to Lambda Sagittarii) is the star's Bayer designation.

It bore the traditional name Kaus Borealis, which derives from the Arabic قوس qaws 'bow' and Latin boreālis 'northern'. In 2016, the International Astronomical Union organized a Working Group on Star Names (WGSN) to catalog and standardize proper names for stars. The WGSN's first bulletin of July 2016 included a table of the first two batches of names approved by the WGSN; which included Kaus Borealis for this star.

This star, with Gamma Sagittarii, Delta Sagittarii, Epsilon Sagittarii, Zeta Sagittarii, Sigma Sagittarii, Tau Sagittarii and Phi Sagittarii comprises the Teapot asterism.

In the catalogue of stars in the Calendarium of Al Achsasi al Mouakket, this star was designated Rai al Naaim, which was translated into Latin as Pastor Struthionum, meaning keeper of the ostriches.

This star is Al Tizini's Rāʽi al Naʽāïm (ألراع ٱلنعم), the Keeper of the Naʽams (Ostrich), meaning the "keeper" the two asterisms al-Naʽām al-Wārid ( النعام الوارد ), "The Going Ostriches" and al-Naʽām al-Ṣādir (النعم الصادر),  "The Returning Ostriches".

References

External links
Kaus Borealis

K-type subgiants
Sagittarius (constellation)
Sagittarii, Lambda
Durchmusterung objects
Sagittarii, 22
090496
169916
6913
Kaus Borealis